Szent Gellért tér – Műegyetem (formerly Szent Gellért tér) is a station of Line 4 of the Budapest Metro. It is located beneath the eponymous square, named after St. Gerard (Szent Gellért), patron saint of Budapest. The station was opened on 28 March 2014 as part of the inaugural section of the line, from Keleti pályaudvar to Kelenföld vasútállomás. Artist Tamás Komoróczky was commissioned to design the mosaic interior decoration of the inner platform below the University of Technology and Economics. It is the deepest station on Line 4.

Connections
Bus: 7, 107, 133E
Tram: 19, 41, 47, 48, 49, 56, 56A

References

Official web page of the construction

M4 (Budapest Metro) stations
Railway stations opened in 2014
2014 establishments in Hungary